Angeline Myra Keen (1905–1986) was an American malacologist and invertebrate paleontologist. She was an expert on the evolution of marine mollusks. With a PhD in psychology. Keen went from being a volunteer, identifying shells at Stanford, and having no formal training in biology or geology, to being one of the world's foremost malacologists. She was called the "First Lady of Malacology".

Early life and education

Myra Keen was born on May 23, 1905, in Colorado Springs, Colorado, to parents Ernest Byron and Mary Thurston Keen. Pursuing being a concert pianist was Myra's first goal even before pursuing earth sciences, classical music was one of her greatest joys and particularly enjoyed Brahms. Initially Myra was thinking of pursuing entomology but her squeamish stomach did not serve her well. She finally turned to psychology as her field of study. Keen attended Colorado College and graduated in 1930 with a degree in psychology. Shortly after she decided to continue her education when she won a fellowship to Stanford University in 1931, completing her Masters. Keen went on to complete her PhD in psychology, attending the University of California, Berkeley in 1934.

While studying at Berkeley, Keen became interested in seashells, which she collected during trips to Monterey in the summer. The discovery of these sea shells sparked Keen's interest in Malacology, and she spent the following summer in Monterey collecting different specimens and sea shells. Struggling to find a job, Keen started volunteering at Stanford's Hopkins Marine Station, identifying seashells for the geology department and working under Ida Shepard Oldroyd. Keen was able to establish a connection with Oldroyd, who at the time was the curator of shell collections at Stanford University. The volunteer position was her first time studying mollusks, aside from previous classes in geology, biology and statistics.

Career

After she graduated and received her PH.D, Keen was unable to find a job within the field of psychology due to the major impact of The Great Depression, leaving her unemployed. However, at the same time, some seashells she bought from a curio shop in Berkeley drew her attention and during a trip to Monterey she found more. She went back to school at Stanford and worked under Ida Oldroyed as her research assistant. Later, she decided to work voluntarily at Stanford with her supervisor Dr. Hubert Schenk, a Stanford paleontologist. She said since then, she was finally under the tutelage of someone who could provide her the academic instructions she truly desired. While working alongside these researchers, Keen continued to attend geology classes that focused on paleontology and stratigraphy. After working under and alongside researchers for years, Keen was able to move up in her career at the university by being appointed as the Curatorial Assistant in Paleontology, as opposed to an unpaid research assistant. Eventually, Keen became the first woman to teach geology at Stanford. She taught and curated at Stanford for eighteen years while working up the ladder by first becoming an Assistant Professor, then Associate Professor, and then finally a full Professor, which was a great achievement for women at the time. Some of the courses that she taught as a professor were paleontology, curatorial methods, and biological oceanography. She was encouraged to concentrate on malacology after coming under the influence of Hubert Gregory Schenck. She was a very good teacher and was one of the only three women professors teaching science at Stanford. Her teaching success was shown through her student’s ability to achieve professions of scientists, curators, and malacology department heads.

 Although Keen did not have a degree in paleontology, she became the curator of paleontology at Stanford University in 1936, replacing former curator and mentor Ida Oldroyd.  In 1954 Keen became Assistant Professor of Paleontology, followed by Curator of Malacology in 1957. In 1964 she was awarded a Guggenheim Fellowship.

Keen retired in 1970 as Professor of Paleontology Emeritus and Curator of Malacology Emeritus. She was a member of Phi Beta Kappa and a fellow at the Geological Society of America and the Paleontological Society. In 1979 she was the first woman to be given the Fellow Medal from the California Academy of Sciences. She served as chair of the Committee on Nomenclature of the Society of Systematic Zoology. She was also president of the Western Society of Malacologists and the American Malacological Union.

Myra Keen was active in publishing. She wrote nine books. A few of her most noted published books are, Abridged Check List and Bibliography of West North American Mollusca (1937), Check List of California Tertiary Marine Mollusca (1944) which she co-wrote with Herdis Bentson, Sea Shells of Tropical West America (1958), and a second edition (1971) with the assistance James H. McLean,  Marine Molluscan Genera of Western North America: An Illustrated Key (1963), and a second edition (1974), coauthored with Eugene Coan. In addition, Keen wrote over seventy-five papers that were published in scholarly journals. One of the first articles she wrote was focused on her documentation of how molluscan faunas reacted to changes at different latitudes due to the gradual cooling of the sea. The study that she published on this subject was valuable to geologists for two main reasons. It helped geologists understand the temperature change of the sea in past times, as well as identifying source areas of sedimentary rocks that had moved to new positions due to continental drift.

Her research work focused around mollusk systematics, as well as marine molluscan Cenozoic paleontology, neontology and zoogeography of the western North America and marine mollusk fauna from the Panamic Province. She helped catalog, organize and collect for the Cenozoic mollusk collection at Stanford. Keen provided the first research documentation regarding how the distribution of mollusks on the Pacific coast is affected by temperature. In 1960, in the eastern Pacific Ocean, she discovered the first living examples of bivalved gastropods, which were in the species and subspecies Berthelinia chloris belvederica. Prior to this discovery, bivalved gastropods had been identified as bivalves, based on the shell characteristics.

In 1975, Keen was invited to meet with Emperor Hirohito of Japan. He was a collector of shells, and had sent Keen specimens. The two also exchanged papers. When he visited in 1975 the two met in San Francisco, where they discussed their shared interest of shells and invertebrates. Keen's graduate students included the Japanese Paleontologist and Malacologist Katsura Ōyama from 1955 to 1957.

Awards and achievements 
In the beginning of Keen's studies, she was given a fellowship and a scholarship for her intelligence at Stanford in 1931.

Myra Keen was elected president of the American Malacological Union for 1948, and was given the Award of Honor of the American Malacological Union in 1963. Also in 1948, she helped organize the American Malacological Union—Pacific Division.

The Guggenheim Fellowship, also known as the "mid career award", is open to numerous citizens in the United States, Canada and a few other countries. Recipients are to be recognized for their great demonstrations within their preferred source of research, Keen's being Natural Sciences. Keen was awarded as a fellow in 1964.

As of 1984, Myra Keen was lucky enough to achieve a citation from the College of Colorado for her personal studies in Natural Sciences, along with her fantastic discoveries within living Mollusks and fossils. To follow her special citation, Keen also has the recognition of 40 Mollusks named after her.

The medal of California Academy of Sciences was awarded to Myra Keen, fellow, in 1979 for her well thought out contributions.

Myra Keen was actively involved in Stanford in the science faculty, which was a major achievement for women at the time since they were not recognized as being essential contributors to the advancement in the field of geology and other science departments, as it was a male dominated industry. As mentioned, she was one of the first three women professors at Stanford. Thus, Keen is acknowledged by Stanford as being key in paving the way for women's advancements at the university. As a student and professor, she experienced sexism. She was active in the campus group, The Women of the Faculty. The group met monthly, sharing achievements and experiences. Keen served as the group's historian, and was the group's third chairman from 1958 to 1960.

Retirement and death

After retirement, Myra Keen was still actively involved in the lives of her students and colleagues. Even though she could no longer continue to pursue her own career, Keen continued to review the manuscripts of her colleagues, and keep in touch with her former students. Myra began to become involved within her community, and was on the board of the Friends Association of Service for the Elderly. Keen's collection of fossils and mollusks she curated were transferred to the California Academy of Sciences, and her publications can still be found at Stanford University.

After her battle with her failing eyesight and arthritis, Myra Keen died at age 80 in Santa Rosa, California, on January 4, 1986, as a result of cancer.

Publications
 Marine Molluscan Genera of Western North America; An Illustrated Key. Stanford: Stanford University Press (1974). 
 Sea Shells of Tropical West America: Marine Mollusks from Baja California to Peru. Stanford: Stanford University Press (1971).

References

External links
 Myra Keen from the Monterey Bay Paleontological Society
Myra Keen Oral History, conducted by Margo Davis (1977)

20th-century American geologists
American paleontologists
1905 births
1986 deaths
American women geologists
American feminists
American malacologists
Women paleontologists
Fellows of the Geological Society of America
American Quakers
Deaths from cancer in California
Colorado College alumni
Stanford University alumni
Stanford University Department of Geology faculty
University of California, Berkeley alumni
People from Colorado Springs, Colorado
20th-century American zoologists
20th-century American women scientists
20th-century Quakers